is a Japanese media franchise created by Hideaki Anno and owned by Khara. Most of the franchise features an apocalyptic mecha action story, which revolves around the efforts by the paramilitary organization NERV to fight hostile beings called Angels, using giant humanoids called Evangelions (or EVAs for short) that are piloted by select teenagers. Subsequent works deviate from this theme to varying degrees, focusing more on romantic interactions between the characters, plotlines not present in the original works, and reimaginings of the conflicts from the original works.

The Neon Genesis Evangelion manga debuted in Shōnen Ace in December 1994, to generate interest in the upcoming anime release. The Neon Genesis Evangelion anime was written and directed by Hideaki Anno, originally airing from October 1995 until March 1996. The general consensus is that the anime was groundbreaking; it explored religious, psychological, and philosophical themes, while initially appearing to be a standard mecha show. There was some debate over the controversial ending of the television series. In response, two films were made to provide an alternate ending for the show: Neon Genesis Evangelion: Death & Rebirth, released in March 1997, and The End of Evangelion released in July 1997. Death is a 60 minute compilation of parts from the first 24 episodes of the TV series, with some new footage added in order to prepare for Rebirth, which contains the last to episodes and also the first 30 minutes of End of Evangelion.

The popularity of the show spawned numerous additional media, including video games, radio dramas, audio books, a light novel series, pachinko machines, and a tetralogy of films titled Rebuild of Evangelion. Other derivative works include Angelic Days, Petit Eva: Evangelion@School and Shinji Ikari Raising Project. Neon Genesis Evangelion has become one of the highest-grossing media franchises of all time.

Setting 
Works within the Neon Genesis Evangelion franchise typically have the same setting, characters and theme, but can vary in their portrayal of the different storylines with alternate re-tellings of the original anime. Many of the later works, such as Death & Rebirth and The Rebuild of Evangelion especially begin to diverge from the original anime. Evangelions fictional setting takes place after the Second Impact, a cataclysmic explosion in Antarctica in the year 2000, which resulted in the deaths of billions and threw the Earth off its axis. Fifteen years after the Second Impact, a group of mysterious beings referred to as "Angels" begin appearing and pose a worldwide and existential threat to the remaining parts mankind. The NERV organization, a paramilitary special agency recruited and controlled by the UN, is tasked with defeating the Angels, with the use of giant mechanical warriors known as "Evangelions". A select group of children pilot the Evangelions, with a focus on Shinji Ikari, Rei Ayanami and Asuka Langley Soryu. As the story progresses, it delves into philosophical and psychological themes such as identity, trauma, and the nature of existence. The relationships between the characters are also explored, particularly between Shinji, Asuka, and Rei, as they navigate their complex and sometimes contentious dynamics. The backdrop of Neon Genesis Evangelion slowly reveals the true nature of Rei Ayanami, the Evangelions, the Angels, the NERV organization and a group known as SEELE. Religious themes, include Christianity and Kabbalah references to Adam, Lilith and the Dead Sea Scrolls. The series is well known for its psychoanalysis of the characters, especially featuring the theories of famous psychologists like Jung and Freud. This is most heavily covered in the implementation of the Human Instrumentality Project, the secret goal of NERV and SEELE, whose result varies across different media, including the original anime, films, manga and video games.

TV series, original net animation and films

Neon Genesis Evangelion 
Neon Genesis Evangelion also known simply as Evangelion or Eva, is a Japanese mecha anime television series produced by Gainax and animated by Tatsunoko, directed by Hideaki Anno and broadcast on TV Tokyo from October 1995 to March 1996. It was the first installation in the franchise, and also the second of Gainax' works to reach such acclaim, the earlier being Nadia: The Secret of Blue Water. Evangelion is set fifteen years after a worldwide cataclysm named Second Impact, particularly in the futuristic fortified city of Tokyo-3. The protagonist is Shinji Ikari, a teenage boy who is recruited by his father Gendo to the shadowy organization Nerv to pilot a giant bio-machine mecha named Evangelion into combat against beings known as Angels.

The series explores the experiences and emotions of Evangelion pilots and members of Nerv as they try to prevent Angels from causing more cataclysms. In the process, they are called upon to understand the ultimate causes of events and the motives for human action. The series has been described as a deconstruction of the mecha genre and it features archetypal imagery derived from Shinto cosmology as well as Jewish and Christian mystical traditions, including Midrashic tales and Kabbalah. The psychoanalytic accounts of human behavior put forward by Freud and Jung are also prominently featured. Neon Genesis Evangelion was awarded The Exellence Award at the Japan Media Arts-festival in 1997. The word "confusing" shows up almost continuously in reviews of the series, together with "controversial" and "complex". Critics saw Evangelion very positively, with it's stylised and thematic characteristics.

Neon Genesis Evangelion: Death & Rebirth 

Neon Genesis Evangelion: Death & Rebirth, is a 1997 Japanese animated science fiction psychological drama film and the first installment of the Neon Genesis Evangelion feature film project and consists of two parts. The project, whose overarching title translates literally to New Century Gospel: The Movie, was released in response to the success of the TV series and a strong demand by fans for an alternate ending. Its components have since been re-edited and re-released several times.
Death is a sixty-minute summary of the first twenty-four parts of Neon Genesis Evangelion. New scenes were added, which were later added to the series itself in its "Director's Cut". The purpose of Death is to set the stage for Rebirth, which is a re-made version of the series' last two parts. Death was reworked twice. Once as Death(true) in which the new scenes were removed after they had been added to the series and shown without Rebirth. Then another version was released, Death(true)2, in which Adam's embryo was added to Gendo's hand and various cuts were made to the film. Death(true)2 is the version included in Revival of Evangelion, the final version of the films. and the first half of an unfinished new ending, titled Rebirth, a retelling of episodes 25 and 26 of the television series as the events of the Human Instrumentality Project unfold from an external point of view.

The End of Evangelion 

The End of Evangelion, released on July 19, 1997, is the completed version of Rebirth, an alternate version of the final episodes of the television series. SEELE attacks NERV, using their Mass Production Evangelion units, all in an attempt to complete the Human Instrumentality Project and initiate the Third Impact. It was written by Hideaki Anno, directed by Anno and Kazuya Tsurumaki, and animated by Gainax and Production I.G. It serves as an alternate ending to the television series, as the earlier mentioned episodes were quite controversial.

The story follows Shinji Ikari, Rei Ayanami and Asuka Langley Soryu, the pilots of the Evangelions during the beginning of the Third Impact. Shinji is subjected to the Human Instrumentality Project, a process in which human souls are merged into a single divine entity. The film features the voice actors of the original series, including Megumi Ogata as Shinji, Yuko Miyamura as Asuka, and Megumi Hayashibara as Rei. The End of Evangelion was a box-office success, grossing ¥2.47 billion. It was honoured with "Most Popular Film" at the Awards of the Japanese Academy, the Animation Kobe, and it also won the 1997 Animage Anime Grand Prix, and was praised for its violence, direction, editing, emotional power, and script, though some reviewers criticized its oblique religious symbolism and abstraction.

Petit Eva: Evangelion@School 

Petit Eva: Evangelion@School is a chibi-style ONA series that ran for 24 broadcasts from March 20, 2007 to March 11, 2009 it was adapted from Petit Eva and Petit Eva Bokura Tanken Dōkōkai spin off manga illustrated by Ryusuke Hamamoto and Maki Ozora. It is a parody of the original series, where the original cast are now students at a junior high school in Tokyo-3. There are other minor differences to Neon Genesis Evangelion as well, such as the fact that the three Rei clones are now sisters and that the Evangelion Unit-01 is now a human sized student.

Rebuild of Evangelion 

Rebuild of Evangelion, known in Japan and on Amazon Prime Video as Evangelion: New Theatrical Edition (ヱヴァンゲリヲン新劇場版, Evangerion Shin Gekijōban), is a Japanese animated film series and a retelling of the original Neon Genesis Evangelion anime television series, produced by Studio Khara. Hideaki Anno served as the writer and general manager of the project, with Kazuya Tsurumaki and Masayuki directing the films themselves. Yoshiyuki Sadamoto, Ikuto Yamashita and Shirō Sagisu returned to provide character designs, mechanical designs and music respectively.

The film tetralogy uses digital ink and paint, some 3D CG animation, and provides new scenes, settings and characters, with a completely new conclusion in the fourth and final film. Another stated intention of the series is for it to be more accessible to non-fans than the original TV series and films were. It was made to present an alternate retelling of episodes 1-19 of the TV series (including new scenes, settings, and characters) and a completely new conclusion to the story. The first film Evangelion: 1.0 You Are (Not) Alone was released in Japan on September 1, 2007, with Evangelion: 2.0 You Can (Not) Advance and Evangelion: 3.0 You Can (Not) Redo released on June 27, 2009 and November 17, 2012 respectively. The final film, Evangelion: 3.0+1.0 Thrice Upon a Time, was released on March 8, 2021.

Proposed live-action film 
Development of a live-action movie version of Neon Genesis Evangelion by Gainax, Weta Workshop Ltd., and ADV Films (then the worldwide distributor of the Evangelion series outside of Asia and Australia) was announced at the Cannes Film Festival on May 21, 2003. Early coverage included ADV Films raising "about half of the $100 million to $120 million needed to produce the film" and some concept art produced by Weta Workshop.

As time passed without any official announcements of production, the film project showed increasing signs of being in development hell. At Anime Expo 2008, ADV founders Matt Greenfield and John Ledford revealed that they had hired the producer John Woo, pitched the idea to other producers such as Jerry Bruckheimer and Steven Spielberg, and seen increased interest in the wake of the success of the 2007 film Transformers. At Ohayocon 2009, Matt Greenfield announced that several U.S. studios were competing for final rights to the project, predicting an official announcement naming the studio, director, and perhaps casting information within the next nine months (he later noted that the closer he got to sealing a deal, the less he could say anything about it). Though the sudden collapse and asset sale of A.D. Vision in September 2009 raised concerns over the project's viability, Greenfield, Ledford, and producer Joseph Chou insisted the project was still actively searching for a director (claiming delays owed more to the general deterioration of the American anime market than to ADV's internal issues).

In August 2011, A.D. Vision sued Gainax, claiming their refusal to accept an option payment for the perpetual live-action rights to Evangelion was a breach of contract and resulted in losing an opportunity to produce the film with a major studio. A.D. Vision has asked to be awarded the full live-action rights and any accruing legal fees.

Manga and light novel 
A number of manga series based on the anime have been released, most notably the official series by series character designer Yoshiyuki Sadamoto, which was first serialized in February 1995 (eight months before the series' official premiere, in order to promote interest), and ended in November 2014, 19 years later. Seven other manga have been created: the shoujo romance story Neon Genesis Evangelion: Angelic Days by Fumino Hayashi, shonen comedy Shinji Ikari Raising Project by Takahashi Osamu, self-parody It's A Miraculous Win by Koume Yoshida, mystery series Neon Genesis Evangelion: Campus Apocalypse by Min Min, chibi comedic parody Petit Eva: Evangelion@School, detective story Neon Genesis Evangelion: The Shinji Ikari Detective Diary and gamer-themed parody Neon Genesis Evangelion: Legend of the Piko-Piko Middle School Students.

A light novel series Neon Genesis Evangelion: ANIMA was serialized from 2008 to 2013 in Dengeki Hobby Magazine, authored by the series mechanical designer Ikuto Yamashita. The series set in an alternate future diverging from the events of the anime. The novel begins 3 years after the end of the Human Instrumentality Project, replacing episodes 25 and 26 of the anime, as well as the End of Evangelion film. The team of former Eva pilots are coming to terms with the aftermath of the battle at NERV HQ, while adapting to normal life. Three clones of Ayanami Rei have been put into Eva units and sent into space as a precautionary way to seek out and eradicate the remaining mass-produced Evangelion units, as well as monitor Earth's safety. In 2021, the final film of the Rebuild of Evangelion tetralogy, Evangelion: 3.0+1.0 Thrice Upon a Time. the sequel received a re-release called 3.0+1.01, that included a prequel manga to the events of Evangelion: 3.0 You Can (Not) Redo called Evangelion 3.0 (-120 min.), written by co-director Kazuya Tsurumaki at Hideaki Anno's initiative.

In 2010, two tribute manga were released: the collection Neon Genesis Evangelion: Comic Tribute, and another by Tony Takezaki, simply entitled Tony Takezaki's Evangelion.

Soundtracks and music 

Shirō Sagisu composed most of the music for Neon Genesis Evangelion and for the original TV show's three OST albums. He received the 1997 Kobe Animation award for "Best Music Score". King Records and their label Starchild (specializing in music, animation and film) distributed most of the albums, singles and box sets. For the anime series, Yoko Takahashi performed the song "A Cruel Angel's Thesis" which was used as the opening theme song for the series. The song "Fly Me to the Moon" originally by Bart Howard was performed by various voice actors from the anime series and these versions of the song were used as the ending theme song for the series. Theme songs were also granted for the films in the franchise Evangelion: Death and Rebirth, its follow-up The End of Evangelion and four installments of the Rebuild of Evangelion film series. A series of four albums titled "Evangelion Classic" was released, each album containing the classical music of Beethoven, Verdi, Handel, and J.S. Bach respectively.

Other media 
The Evangelion franchise has spread from the original anime into a number of different media, with some following the official canon (of the 26-episode anime series and its three related films or the new Rebuild series) and others differing on important plot points originally introduced in the anime.

Books 
 Newtype 100% Collection: A 1997 collection of Newtypes coverage of Evangelion, particularly of artwork
 Death & Rebirth and End of Evangelion theatrical pamphlets : Limited edition supplementary booklets were distributed in Japanese theaters during the initial run of both Evangelion: Death and Rebirth and The End of Evangelion. The latter pamphlet, nicknamed the "Red Cross Book" by overseas fans, contains descriptions and definitions of many areas and terms in the Evangelion storyline that the series left unclear.
 Der Mond and Die Sterne: Two German-titled art books of the work of Yoshiyuki Sadamoto, including concept art, character designs and renditions, and commentary about the Evangelion series. Both books also feature selections of  Sadamoto's work on earlier and later works (such as Nadia, or Fatal Fury 2).
 2015//The Last Year of Ryohji Kaji: A limited edition, Japan-only publication by Newtype in 1997. The book is a combination photo/text book profiling the character of Ryōji Kaji through 16 mission "documents" left by him. The included letters, notes, and poems were written by Hiroshi Yamaguchi (a writer on the original TV series) and the photographs (including digitally-altered pictures of Evangelions, Angels, and other series-related objects) were taken by Ichiro Kamei.
 Groundwork of Evangelion: is set of artbooks that contains production sketches. The first three cover the anime, with Volume 1 covering episode 1–8, Volume 2 covering 9-19, and Volume 3 covering 20–26. Groundwork of Evangelion The Movie 1 covers the first movie. Groundwork of Evangelion: 1.0 You Are (Not) Alone covers the first Rebuild film. Two volumes cover Groundwork Of Evangelion You Can (Not) Advance 2.0, the second Rebuild film.
 Neon Genesis Evangelion RPG: The NERV White Paper: A 158-page card-based RPG book released on April 20, 1996. It was written by Mitsuuhiro Nakazawa
 Neon Genesis Evangelion Proposal: An early pre-production booklet that describes the premise of the series and introduces the main characters. Many changes were made from the proposal to the finished show, such as different characterization and even unused Angels.

Video games 

Neon Genesis Evangelion has spawned a number of video games. These range from action games such as the same titled game for the Nintendo 64 and its sequel on the PlayStation 2, the fighting game Battle Orchestra, the visual novels Girlfriend of Steel and Girlfriend of Steel 2nd, and the rhythm game 3nd Impact (read "Sound Impact"). Characters from Evangelion also make numerous appearances in other titles such as in the Super Robot Wars series by Banpresto. The mobile game "Monster Strike", by the Japanese company Mixi, did a collaboration featuring dungeons and collectible units from the series.

Audio dramas 
A parody radio drama, Neon Genesis Evangelion – After the End, was released in 1996 as part of the NEON GENESIS EVANGELION ADDITION album. The story features the anime's original cast reuniting to star in a new Evangelion series, while attempting to change various themes of the series to make it more popular/accessible than it already is. A separate Evangelion audio cassette drama was released in 1996.

Pachinko 
A number of Evangelion-themed pachinko and pachisuro machines are offered at pachinko parlors:
 CR Neon Genesis Evangelion (Pachinko)
 CR Neon Genesis Evangelion Second Impact  (Pachinko)
 Neon Genesis Evangelion (Pachisuro)
 CR Neon Genesis Evangelion —Kiseki no Kachi wa—  (Pachinko)

As of March 2018, Evangelion pachinko manufacturer Fields Corporation revealed that the Evangelion franchise has sold a total of 2.317million pachinko and pachislot machines, including 1.752million pachinko machines and 540,000 pachislot machines.

Amusement park 
On July 22, 2010, Fuji-Q Highland opened a 1,460m2 section devoted to Evangelion, featuring a lifesize entry plug and statue of Mari Makinami, an approximately 3-meter titanium Lance of Longinus, NERV hallways with character cutouts that lead to a hangar room with the 1:1 bust of Eva Unit-01, SEELE monoliths, appropriate cosplay, Eva-themed hotel rooms, and food products. A bust of Eva Unit-02 modeled after a scene in Evangelion: 2.0 was installed in 2011.
In late 2018, Universal Studios announced there will be a Godzilla and Evangelion crossover attraction at Universal Studios Japan.

Related media

Japan Animator Expo 
Evangelion: Another Impact is the anime short number 12 from the Japan Animator Expo, a collaboration between the Khara studio and the media company Dwango. The anime short could be seen on the official website of the project, but the website closed on December 31, 2018. Since, a company who sell animal related product have bought the domain name, and the Japan Animator Expo website no longer exist. The credits song is called "Marking Time, Waiting for Death", by Shiro Sagisu.

Transformers
A Transformers x Evangelion crossover featuring a web novel titled "Transformers Mode EVA" and toy line featured a Transformers and Evangelion crossover.

In the events of Transformers Mode "EVA" follows the Autobots arriving in Toyko-3 dealing with a Angel attacked interrupted by the ghost of Starscream who possessed the Angel to attack the Autobots. When Unit-1 was deployed Optimus Prime scand EVA-1 to become Optimus Prime-EVA and with the help of the Autobots and Misato he defeats the Angel/Decepticon hybrid.

Godzilla 
Universal Studios announced there will be a Godzilla and Evangelion crossover with an attraction.

Shinkansen Henkei Robo Shinkalion 
In episode 31 of Shinkansen Henkei Robo Shinkalion anime, Shinji is the pilot of the 500 TYPE EVA, a redo of the Shinkalion 500 Kodama stylized to resembled the real TYPE EVA Livery of the 500 Series Shinkansen and the EVA Unit 01. He only appeared in the crossover episode.

Fanworks 
Evangelion is also popular among doujinshi, inspiring notable titles such as Evangelion RE-TAKE (an unofficial sequel to the End of Evangelion) by Studio Kimigabuchi

and even works by famous manga artists, such as Birth of Evangelion by Yun Kōga.

See also 
 Neon Genesis Evangelion
 Gainax
 Abrahamic Religions
 Kabbalah
 Portrayals of God in Popular Media
 Media Franchise

References

Further reading

External links 
Official Website
''

EvaGeeks - an external wiki

 
Gainax
Impact events in fiction
Kaiju
Mecha anime and manga
Mecha
Mass media franchises
Mythology in popular culture
Fiction about religion
Tatsunoko Production
Works about depression
Science fiction anime and manga
Works about child soldiers
Khara
Hideaki Anno